Connor Swift (born 30 October 1995) is an English racing cyclist, who currently rides for UCI WorldTeam . His cousin, Ben Swift, is also a professional cyclist. In 2018 he won the British National Road Race Championships.

Career
In August 2018  announced that Swift would join the team as a stagiaire until the end of the season. In May 2019 it was announced that Swift would join  with immediate effect, with a role as a domestique for André Greipel. In August 2020, he was named in the startlist for the 2020 Tour de France.

Major results

2017
 Tour Series
1st Bath
1st Stevenage
 7th Velothon Wales
2018
 1st  Road race, National Road Championships
 2nd Overall Kreiz Breizh Elites
 4th Rutland–Melton CiCLE Classic
 5th Overall Tour of the Reservoir
 5th Polynormande
2019
 1st Redditch, Tour Series
 9th Overall Tour de Yorkshire
 9th Overall Tour de Normandie
2021
 1st  Overall Tour Poitou-Charentes en Nouvelle-Aquitaine
 1st Tro-Bro Léon
 3rd Marathon, National MTB Championships
 5th Bretagne Classic
 6th Dwars door het Hageland
 7th Overall Tour of Belgium
2022
 3rd Tro-Bro Léon
 5th Overall Tour Poitou-Charentes en Nouvelle-Aquitaine
 5th Clásica Jaén Paraíso Interior
 7th Overall Étoile de Bessèges

Grand Tour general classification results timeline

References

External links

1995 births
Living people
British male cyclists
English male cyclists
British cycling road race champions
People from Thorne, South Yorkshire